Julie Ann Weflen (born May 3, 1959) is a missing woman who was last seen on September 16, 1987.

Disappearance
Weflen worked as an operator for the Bonneville Power Administration in Spokane, Washington. She parked her minivan in the gravel lot along Four Mound Road and logged into the Spring Hill Substation near Riverside State Park at 2 p.m. on the day she disappeared. BPA workers have stated that she probably finished work and returned to the minivan about 3:45 p.m. Weflen was last seen heading toward a substation at Four Mound and Coulee Hite Road. Her hard hat, toolbox, a water bottle, and a pair of sunglasses were located on the ground beside her truck and the driver's side door and back hatch were found open. Her purse was discovered in the rig where she had worked.

Investigation and aftermath
A reward of $25,000 has been issued for any information leading to the arrest and conviction of the person or people involved in Julie Weflen's disappearance. Since she disappeared, the BPA and local law enforcement officials have received plenty of information, but nothing has ever helped in finding her. Weflen's mother died in 2006.

See also
List of people who disappeared

References

External links

1980s missing person cases
1987 in Washington (state)
Missing person cases in Washington (state)
History of Spokane, Washington
History of women in Washington (state)
September 1987 events in the United States